Michael Paul Springer (born November 3, 1965) is an American professional golfer who played on the PGA Tour and the Nationwide Tour.

Springer was born in San Francisco, California. He attended the University of Arizona. He turned pro in 1988 and joined the PGA Tour in 1991.

Springer began his career in professional golf on the Ben Hogan Tour, a predecessor of what later became the Korn Ferry Tour. He won three events in this venue in 1990 (including the tour's very first event in Bakersfield) and one in 1992. His first PGA Tour win came as a wire-to-wire victory in 1994 at the KMart Greater Greensboro Open. His career year was 1994 when he won two PGA Tour events, earned $770,711, and finished 13th on the money list. Springer has 22 top-10 finishes in PGA Tour events. His best finish in a major is a T-24 at the 1994 British Open.

In the 2000s, Springer split his playing time between the PGA Tour and the Nationwide Tour. He lives in Fresno, California.

Amateur wins (1)
this list may be incomplete
1987 California State Amateur

Professional wins (7)

PGA Tour wins (2)

Ben Hogan Tour wins (4)

Other wins (1)
1993 JCPenney Classic (with Melissa McNamara)

Results in major championships

CUT = missed the half-way cut
"T" = tied

See also
1990 Ben Hogan Tour graduates
1999 PGA Tour Qualifying School graduates
List of golfers with most Web.com Tour wins

References

External links

American male golfers
Arizona Wildcats men's golfers
PGA Tour golfers
Korn Ferry Tour graduates
Golfers from San Francisco
Sportspeople from Fresno, California
1965 births
Living people